JJ Villard's Fairy Tales is an American adult animated horror comedy television series created by J.J. Villard. The series premiered on Cartoon Network's late night programming block, Adult Swim on May 11, 2020.

Cast
J.J. Villard as Police Officer (Little Red Riding Hood) / Cops / Squire / Chaffino
Sheryl Lee as Doreen
Maika Monroe as Snow White
Keith David as Prince Lionel
Finn Wolfhard as Boypunzel
Milly Shapiro as Princess Jezebel / Goldilocks
Jennifer Tilly as Little Red Riding Hood
Warwick Davis as Rumpelstiltskin
Cassandra Peterson as Queen
Corey Feldman as Huntsman / Guard / Leechy
Edwin Neal as Wormy / Earwig / Crabby
Peter Weller as Sergeant Hardcop
Linda Blair as Grandma Sicario Hernandez / Mama Bear / Goldilocks’ Mom
David Patrick Kelly as the Woodsman
Catherine Hicks as Fairy
Alan Oppenheimer as Bearstein / Mirror Max / Roach / Flea Circus
Robert Englund as Hive Head / Porridge Daddy / Toilet
Doug Bradley as Kenneth
John Kassir as Pinocchio / Gelato
Ashley Laurence as Jizzelda
Heather Langenkamp as Charla
Kevin Van Hentenryck as Officer Big Bad Wolf

Episodes

Notes

References

External links
 

2020 American television series debuts
2020 American television series endings
2020s American adult animated television series
2020s American black comedy television series
Adult Swim original programming
American adult animated comedy television series
American adult animated horror television series
English-language television shows